Avatha rufiscripta is a species of moth of the family Erebidae. It is found in Peninsular Malaysia and on Sumatra and Borneo. The habitat consists of lowland forests.

References

Moths described in 1926
Avatha
Moths of Indonesia
Moths of Malaysia